"Make Me Better" is the third single from Fabolous' album From Nothin' to Somethin'. The song features Ne-Yo on the hook and is produced by Timbaland.

Song Content
Timbaland is quoted as saying that:
 "the beat is unique sounding and the strings are so good that they will have to be used on future songs".
The strings are sampled from Sherine's "Al Sa'ban Aleh". As for the lyrics, Fabolous and Ne-Yo tell ladies they are forces to be reckoned with on their own — but with their ladies upgrading them, they're that much better.
"You want a girl that completes you and makes you better," he explained. "You don't want a girl who brings more arguments and more bills. ... You want a girl who, when you're walking around with your tie crooked, she fixes your tie. .... That's the kind of [woman] I'm looking for. Whether she's a celebrity or non-celebrity don't really matter. You just need somebody you can connect with. "It touches so many places," Fab added of the song. "It's a sexy record, plus a swagger record, an anthem record all in one. ... I played it for a couple of dudes a week ago, and they was like, 'I'mma tell my shorty that: "Yo, shorty, you make me better. I'm cool, I'm fly and sh--, but us together, we make a great pair." "Dudes can take it — it's giving them some game. I felt it could work on all levels."

The full song was leaked to the internet on April 9, 2007.

The beat was originally created for rapper Eve and featured Timbaland over a song called "Nothing to Say." On April 5, 2019, Eve revealed on The Talk (which she co-hosts) when working on Here I Am'' she revealed that beats originally intended for her album were sold to other artists by her label without her consent including "Nothing to Say" which became "Make Me Better."

Music video
A video was released on May 23, 2007. You may watch it  here.  Roselyn Sánchez appears as Fabolous's love interest in the video. This video was premiered on BET on May 25, 2007. This video also includes the rapper Red Cafe and a guest star Dwight Freeney as a person who is challenged by a drunken man.

Chart Success
On the issue date of June 9, 2007 the single debuted on the Billboard Hot 100 at number 96 and has peaked at number 8.  The single has spent 14 weeks at number 1 in the Billboard Hot 100 Rap Tracks. This is a record for 2006 and 2007 on this chart.

In its January 2008 issue, VIBE Magazine named "Make Me Better" the best song of 2007 on its list of the top 44.

Remixes
The official remix was produced by Drumma Boy & Atlanta DJ Greg Street and was called the "Greg Street Remix". There are 2 official versions of the remix, the main official remix features the group Jagged Edge & the second remix features Lil' Mo. The remix samples The Isley Brothers' "Between the Sheets".

Wu-Tang Clan member Raekwon did an official remix to the song, the remix samples his 1995 track "Rainy Dayz" on Raekwon's verses.

Track listings
1. Make Me Better (Explicit Version) - 4:13
2. Make Me Better (Clean Version) - 4:13
3. Make Me Better (Greg Street Remix) - 5:26
4. Make Me Better (Demo Edit) - 2:50

Charts

Weekly charts

Year-end charts

References

External links
 [ Billboard Link]
 “Make Me Better” by Fabolous celebrates true love in Hip-Hop

2007 singles
Fabolous songs
Ne-Yo songs
Song recordings produced by Timbaland
Songs written by Timbaland
Songs written by Ne-Yo
Music videos directed by Erik White
2007 songs
Songs written by Fabolous
Def Jam Recordings singles